Budaq Monshi Qazvini, was a Persian composer of the Jawaher al-akbar, a general history of a considerable part of the Persianate realm, and representative of the Safavid financial cabinet during the reign of shah Tahmasp I (r. 1524-1576).

Sources 
 

1510 births
16th-century writers of Safavid Iran
Safavid historians
People from Qazvin
16th-century deaths
Safavid civil servants
16th-century Iranian writers